Gyo-dong is a dong or neighborhood in the metropolitan city of Daegu, South Korea. It is one of legal dong under its administrative dong Seongnae 1-dong's jurisdiction. The name, Gyo-dong originates from the fact that the area has had a hyanggyo, government-managed Confucian academies during the Joseon Dynasty. It belonged to Dongsang-myeon, Daegu-bu during the Joseon Dynasty

Gyeong-dong Market is located in the center of the city beside Dong-a Department store. On an alley on the opposite site of the market is clustered with movie theatres, such as Daegu Theatre, Jayu Theatre and Songju Theatre.

See also
Gyo-dong, Gyeongju

References

Jung District, Daegu
Neighbourhoods in South Korea